Filiz Taçbaş (born 1964) is a Turkish film and television series actress and former national tennis player.

Early life
Filiz Taçbaş was born in İzmir, Turkey in 1964. She is of Azerbaijani descent.

Already at age ten, she appeared as child actress in the film Bacım (literally "My Sister"), written and directed by Bilge Olgaç. In 1981, she won the first place in the "Fresh Faces" beauty contest organized by the children's magazine Saklambaç. She started acting in the Theatre Abdullah Şahin. She played on stage with Defne Yalnız, Müjdat Gezen, Abdullah Şahin, Enis Fosforoğlu and Teoman Aksoy. She also worked as a model at the fashion shows of fashion designer Zühal Yorgancıoğlu abroad.

Actress
She continued her acting career in films after a long break. In 1987, she appeared in the film Aile Pansiyonu with Adile Naşit.

Her recognition by a wide audience came in 1992 with her role in the TV series Mahallenin Muhtarları (literally: "Representatives of the Neighborhood"). She played the character "Behiye" in the TV series until 2002. Between 2006 and 2014, Taçbaş played in the TV crime series Arka Sokaklar ("Back Streets") in the role of teacher "Ayla Soylu", the wife of Chief Superintendent "Rıza Soylu", played by Zafer Ergin. She acted in the TV series Ah Neriman with Perran Kutman in 2014. In 2020, she joined the cast of the  TV series Çukur ("Pit").

Tennis player
Taçbaş played tennis professionally. In 2007, after getting a high score, she was admitted to the national team qualifiers, and became a member of the Turkey national team. She also writes columns on tennis in newspapers. She was the tennis partner of Hülya Avşar.

Private life
In 2000, she married tennis coach and tennis court manager Cavit Yavuz, whom she met during a tennis tournament about a year before. She gave birth to their daughter Selin in 2002. The couple divorced in 2011. 

Tired of city life, in early 2020 Taçbaş moved to Aliağa in İzmir Province, where she purchased  of agricultural land. She obtained a farming certificate from the local Directorate of Agriculture, Forestry and Rural Affairs.  She started agriculture farming by growing olive, lemon, and various fruits in her field.

For her acting career, she commutes between Aliağa and the film set in Istanbul.

Filmography

Films

Short films

Videos

TV series

References

External links
Filiz Taçbaş at IMDb

1964 births
Living people
Turkish people of Azerbaijani descent
Sportspeople from İzmir
Actresses from İzmir
Turkish female tennis players
Turkish film actresses
Turkish television actresses
20th-century Turkish actresses
21st-century Turkish actresses
Turkish farmers
Turkish women farmers